The Iraq National Salvation Party is one of the parties that participated in the January 30, 2005 National Assembly legislative election in Iraq.

In the 2005 election, the party received 496 votes, or 0.0058% of the ballot. Ignoring independent Ghalib Muhsin Abd Hussein Al-Sabahi, they received the fewest votes among any party.

Political parties in Iraq